Andrew Gomes (23 June 1887 – 4 July 1967) was a Guyanese cricketer. He played in three first-class matches for British Guiana from 1912 to 1924.

See also
 List of Guyanese representative cricketers

References

External links
 

1887 births
1967 deaths
Guyanese cricketers
Guyana cricketers